Yong Jin Choi is a paralympic athlete from South Korea competing mainly in category T36 track events.

Yong Jin competed in the 2000 and 2004 Summer Paralympics, on both occasions he competed in the 400m, 800m and 1500m.  He won two medals a gold in the 1500m and silver in the 800m both in the 2000 games.

References

External links
 

Paralympic athletes of South Korea
Athletes (track and field) at the 2000 Summer Paralympics
Athletes (track and field) at the 2004 Summer Paralympics
Paralympic gold medalists for South Korea
Paralympic silver medalists for South Korea
Living people
Medalists at the 2000 Summer Paralympics
Year of birth missing (living people)
Place of birth missing (living people)
Paralympic medalists in athletics (track and field)
South Korean male middle-distance runners